The California Golden Seals were a professional ice hockey club that competed in the National Hockey League (NHL) from 1967 to 1976. Based in Oakland, California, they played their home games at the Oakland–Alameda County Coliseum Arena. The Seals were one of six teams added to the league as part of the 1967 NHL expansion. Initially named the California Seals, the team was renamed the Oakland Seals during the 1967–68 season and then the Bay Area Seals in 1970 before becoming the California Golden Seals the same year.

The Seals were the least successful of the teams added in the 1967 expansion, never earning a winning record and only making the playoffs twice in nine seasons of play. Off the ice, they were plagued by low attendance. The franchise was relocated in 1976 to become the Cleveland Barons, who would cease operations two years later. They are the only franchise from the 1967 expansion never to reach the Stanley Cup Finals.

History

Founding

In 1966, the NHL announced that six expansion teams would be added as a new division for the 1967–68 season, officially because of a general desire to expand the league to new markets, but also to squelch the Western Hockey League's threat to turn into a major league. The San Francisco Seals were one such team from the WHL. The NHL awarded an expansion team to Barry Van Gerbig for the San Francisco Bay area. Van Gerbig decided to purchase the WHL club with the intent of bringing them into the NHL as an expansion team the following season.

Van Gerbig had planned to have the team play in a new arena in San Francisco, but the new arena was never built. He decided to move the team across the Bay from the Cow Palace in Daly City to Oakland to play in the new Oakland–Alameda County Coliseum Arena. He renamed the club the California Seals. This was done in an attempt to appeal to fans from San Francisco, and to address complaints from the other NHL teams that Oakland was not considered a major league city and would not be a draw for fans.

A year later, Van Gerbig brought the Seals into the NHL as an expansion team. The team participated with the other five expansion teams in the 1967 NHL Expansion Draft; however, the terms imposed by the established Original Six teams were very one-sided in their favor. The existing NHL teams were permitted to protect nearly all of their best players, thus the players available for selection were mostly castoffs, aging players well past their prime and career minor leaguers. To bolster their roster and also to maintain a semblance of familiarity and continuity for existing Seals fans, the team retained a portion of the club's WHL roster such as Charlie Burns, George Swarbrick, Gerry Odrowski, Tom Thurlby, and Ron Harris.

The Bay Area was not considered a particularly lucrative hockey market; however, the terms of a new television agreement with CBS called for two of the expansion teams to be located in California and other than the Kings there were no other prospective franchise applicants of similar pedigree to the Seals. Nevertheless, while the WHL Seals had drawn well at the Cow Palace the team drew poorly in Oakland once they entered the NHL. The plan to bring fans in from San Francisco failed, and on November 6, 1967, Van Gerbig announced that the team's name would be changed to the Oakland Seals (although the league did not register the change until December 8 to focus more on the East Bay).

Struggles

The Seals were never successful at the gate even after the name change, and because of this poor attendance Van Gerbig threatened on numerous occasions to move the team elsewhere. First-year coach and general manager Bert Olmstead publicly advocated a move to Vancouver, resulting in an offer from Labatt's brewery to purchase and relocate the team to the Canadian city as well as a proposal to move the team to Buffalo from the Knox brothers, who like Vancouver had been shut out of the 1967 expansion. The NHL, not wanting to endanger its TV deal with CBS, rejected both proposals. As it turned out, the league's 1970 expansion would include Vancouver and Buffalo. The Knoxes bought a minority share of the Seals in 1969, only to sell it a year later to fund the Sabres.

This, as well as the team's mediocre on-ice performance, led to major changes to both the Seals' front office and the roster – only 7 of the 20 Seals players remained after the first season. The new-look Seals were somewhat more successful. In their second season they improved to 69 points, which while still seven games below .500 was good enough for second place in the all-expansion West Division. The Seals were actually favored to win their first round playoff matchup against the Kings, but were upset in seven games. Oakland regressed to 58 points the following season, but still edged out Philadelphia for the final playoff spot on a tiebreaker. Their second playoff appearance was a brief one as they were swept by the Pittsburgh Penguins. Those were the only two years that the franchise made the playoffs.

The league's rejection of a proposed move to Vancouver prompted a lawsuit that was not settled until 1974 (San Francisco Seals Ltd. v. National Hockey League). The Seals organization filed suit against the NHL claiming that the prohibition violated the Sherman Act. The Seals asserted that the league's constitution was in violation by prohibiting clubs from relocating their operations, and that the relocation request was denied in an attempt to keep the San Francisco market in the NHL and thereby discourage the formation of a rival team or league in that location. The court ruled that the NHL was a single entity, and that the teams were not competitors in an economic sense, so the league restrictions on relocation were not a restraint of trade.

For the 1969–70 season the team was sold to Trans-National Communications, whose investors included Pat Summerall and Whitey Ford. However, the group filed for bankruptcy after missing a payment and relinquished the team to Van Gerbig, who put the team back on the market.

Charles O. Finley purchases the franchise

Prior to the 1970–71 season, Charles O. Finley, the flamboyant owner of baseball's Oakland Athletics, purchased the Seals. Finley and Roller Derby boss Jerry Seltzer had both put in a bid on the team. Although Seltzer's offer was slightly better and included a more detailed plan for revival, a majority of NHL owners from the "old establishment" voted in favor of Finley. General manager Bill Torrey left by mid-season due to clashes with Finley.

Finley renamed the team the "Bay Area Seals" to begin the 1970–71 season, but after just two games into the season on October 16, 1970, he changed the team name to the "California Golden Seals", following a number of other marketing gimmicks intended to promote the team to the fans, among them changing the Seals' colors to green and gold to match those of the popular A's. The team's uniform crest was now the word "Seals" in a unique typeface, but an alternate logo using a sketch based on a photo of star player Carol Vadnais was used on marketing materials such as pennants, stickers and team programs. The original 1967 California Seals logo recolored in green and gold was often seen on trading cards and other unofficial material, but was never adopted by the team. The Seals are remembered for wearing white skates, but initially Torrey convinced Finley to use green and gold painted skates instead, as team-colored skates were a trend of the period. However, this was all for naught, as the Seals finished with the worst record in the NHL that year. Other innovations that Finley's Seals incorporated, were the inclusion of player names on the back of the jerseys, which then set the precedent for today's 32 current NHL teams identifying players in the same fashion. Finley also was the first owner to allow players to fly first class on commercial flights to games, thus starting a trend that ultimately culminated in NHL teams regularly chartering aircraft by the 21st century. The Seals regularly used the new Boeing 747s the airlines had put into service at the time. Finley also introduced the flamboyant green and gold "Seals luggage" which all players and coaches were required to carry, to identify them as the northern California NHL team. On May 22, 1970, the Seals traded their pick in the first round of the 1971 NHL Amateur Draft to the Montreal Canadiens along with Francois Lacombe in return for Montreal's first round pick in the 1970 draft (Seals selected Chris Oddleifson), Ernie Hicke, and cash. As a result of the Seals' dreadful season, the Canadiens had the top pick in the 1971 draft, and used it to select future Hall of Fame member Guy Lafleur. This transaction now ranks as one of the most one-sided deals in NHL history.

Under the ownership of the NHL and Mel Swig
The team rebounded in 1971–72, but the arrival of the World Hockey Association (WHA) wiped out most of those gains. Finley refused to match the WHA's contract offers, causing five of the team's top ten scorers from the previous season to bolt to the new league. Devoid of any defensive talent save for goaltender Gilles Meloche, the Seals sank into last place again in 1972–73, where they would remain for the rest of their history. Although divisional restructuring in 1974–75 included a revamped format in which three teams in each division made the playoffs, the team's efforts were frustrated by their placement in the Adams Division, with the strong Sabres, Boston Bruins, and Toronto Maple Leafs of the day.

Finley soon lost patience with his struggling hockey team, especially given the contrast to his World Series champion Athletics. He tried to sell the Seals, but when no credible buyers came forward who were interested in keeping the team in the Bay Area, he sold the team back to the league for  A 1973 attempt by Finley to sell the team to Indianapolis interests who planned to relocate the team to that city was rejected by the NHL's board 

In early 1975, newspapers reported that the Seals and Pittsburgh Penguins were to be relocated to Denver and Seattle, respectively, in an arrangement that would have seen the two teams sold to groups in those cities that had already been awarded "conditional" franchises for the 1976–77  At the same time, the league announced that if the Seals' sale to the Denver group was not completed or new ownership found locally, the franchise would be liquidated at the end of the season.

The Denver arrangement fell through, and the league ran the Seals for more than a year until a group headed by San Francisco hotel magnate Melvin Swig bought the team on July 28, 1975, with the intention of moving the team to a proposed new arena in San Francisco. The team fell just short of the playoffs, and after a mayoral election, plans for the new arena were cancelled. With a new arena out of the picture, the league dropped their objection to the relocation of the franchise.

The end

Although attendance was finally showing some improvement and the team playing better, minority owners George and Gordon Gund persuaded Swig to seek approval to move the team to their hometown of Cleveland. The team's final game in Oakland was a win over the Los Angeles Kings on April 4, 1976; league approval for the move was granted on July 14, and the team was renamed the "Cleveland Barons" after the city's old AHL squad. After two more years of losses and with attendance worse than it had been in Oakland, the Gunds (by this time majority owners) were permitted to merge the Barons with another failing team, the Minnesota North Stars on June 14, 1978. The merged team continued as the Minnesota North Stars under the Gunds' ownership, but assumed the Barons' place in the Adams Division. The North Stars ultimately relocated to Texas following the 1992–93 season to become the Dallas Stars.

The Cleveland Barons remain the most recent team in an established North American major professional league to fold. They were also the last actively playing NHL team to do so since the Brooklyn Americans in 1942 (the franchise was formally cancelled in 1946) and the last team to cease operations since the Montreal Maroons had their franchise formally canceled in 1947 (though they had not iced a team since 1938). As a result, the NHL consisted of 17 teams for the 1978–79 season.

Legacy
The current NHL team in the Bay Area, the San Jose Sharks, has a historical connection to the Seals. Years after the Barons-North Stars merger, the Gunds wanted to bring hockey back to the Bay Area. They asked the NHL for permission to move the North Stars there in the late 1980s, but the league was unwilling to abandon a traditional hockey market like the Twin Cities. Meanwhile, a group led by former Hartford Whalers owner Howard Baldwin was pushing the NHL to bring a team to San Jose, where an arena was being built. Eventually, a compromise was struck whereby the Gunds would sell their share of the North Stars to Baldwin's group, with the Gunds receiving an expansion team in the Bay Area to begin play in the 1991–92 season. In return, the Sharks would have the rights to players from the North Stars and then participate with the North Stars as an equal partner in an expansion draft with the new franchise. On May 5, 1990, the Gunds officially sold their share of the North Stars to Baldwin and were awarded a new team in the Bay Area that eventually became the Sharks. Ironically, in their first two seasons in the league, the Sharks played their home games at the Cow Palace in Daly City (the same facility the NHL rejected as a home for the Seals in 1967) while their new permanent home arena in San Jose was being completed.

Dennis Maruk was the last Seals player active in the NHL, retiring as a member of the North Stars in 1989. The last former Seals player in any league was George Pesut, who was active in Germany until 1994.

Though no longer an active team, the Seals remained a popular subject, and are the subject of multiple works. In 2006, Brad Kurtzberg published the first book on the Seals franchise, Shorthanded: The Untold Story of the Seals: Hockey's Most Colorful Team. In January 2017, filmmaker Mark Greczmiel released his documentary, The California Golden Seals Story on iTunes. In 2016, the Seals tribute site, GoldenSealsHockey.com was founded to help promote the November 2017 release of the book, The California Golden Seals: a Tale of White Skates, Red Ink, and One of the NHL's Most Outlandish Teams, which covers the Seals' and Barons' entire history, including their six years in the WHL.

The San Jose Sharks unveiled their Reverse Retro jersey based on the final years of the Golden Seals on October 20, 2022.

Season-by-season record 
Note: GP = Games played, W = Wins, L = Losses, T = Ties, Pts = Points, GF = Goals for, GA = Goals against, PIM = Penalties in minutes

Notes:
 1 Named California Seals from October 11 to November 6, 1967.
 2 Renamed California Golden Seals after two games in the season

Franchise records
Includes Cleveland Barons (1976–78)

Career:
 Most games played – Bob Stewart (414)
 Most goals – Dennis Maruk (94)
 Most assists – Al MacAdam (129)
 Most points – Al MacAdam (217)
 Most penalty minutes – Bob Stewart (691)
 Most wins by a goaltender – Gilles Meloche (93)
 Most losses by a goaltender – Gilles Meloche (191)
 Lowest goals against average (GAA) by a goaltender – Charlie Hodge (3.09)
 Most shutouts by a goaltender – Gilles Meloche (11)
 Most minutes – Gilles Meloche (20,666)
 Most wins by a coach – Fred Glover (96)
 Most losses by a coach – Fred Glover (206)

Single season:
 Most goals – Dennis Maruk (36 in 1977–78)
 Most assists – Dennis Maruk (50 in 1976–77)
 Most points – Dennis Maruk (78 in 1976–77)
 Most wins by a goaltender – Gary Smith (21 in 1968–69)
 Most losses by a goaltender – Gary Smith (48 in 1970–71)
 Best goals against average (GAA) by a goaltender – Charlie Hodge (2.86 in 1967–68)
 Most shutouts by a goaltender – Gary Smith (4 in 1968–69) and Gilles Meloche (4 in 1971–72)

Scoring leaders
These are the top ten scorers for the franchise, including its time in Cleveland.

Notable players

Hall of Fame members
 Harry Howell
 Bert Olmstead (inducted as a player but was only a coach for the Seals)
 Craig Patrick (inducted as builder)
 Rudy Pilous (inducted as builder)
 Bill Torrey (inducted as builder)

Team captains
 Bobby Baun, 1967–68
 Ted Hampson, 1968–71
 Carol Vadnais, 1971–72
 Bert Marshall, 1972–73
 Joey Johnston, 1974–75
 Jim Neilson and Bob Stewart, 1975–76  (co-captains) 
Source: The California Golden Seals

General managers
 Rudy Pilous, 1967 (fired before start of season)
 Bert Olmstead, 1967–68 (resigned in March 1968)
 Frank Selke Jr., 1968–70 (resigned in November 1970)
 Bill Torrey, 1970 (resigned in December 1970)
 Fred Glover, 1970–71 (fired in October 1971)
 Garry Young, 1971–72 (fired in November 1972)
 Fred Glover, 1972–74 (resigned in February 1974)
 Garry Young, 1974—given title of Director of Hockey Operations due to NHL ownership of club (resigned before start of 1974–75 season)
 Bill McCreary, 1974–76—given title of Director of Hockey Operations from 1974 to 1975 while club under ownership of NHL. He became general manager in the summer of 1975 after Melvin Swig bought the club from the league

First round draft picks
 1967: Ken Hicks (third overall)
 1968: none
 1969: Tony Featherstone (seventh overall)
 1970: Chris Oddleifson (10th overall)
 1971: none
 1972: none
 1973: none
 1974: Rick Hampton (third overall)
 1975: Ralph Klassen (third overall)

Broadcasters
In 1967–68, KTVU 2 televised 12 games with Tim Ryan on play-by-play. In 1968–69, away games were broadcast on the radio by KEEN with Tim Ryan again on play-by-play. In 1969–70, Saturday and Sunday games were broadcast by KGO radio. Jim Gordon, Bill Schonely and Bill McColgan each did play-by-play alone on multiple games. Meanwhile, Harvey Wittenberg and Rick Weaver did one game each; Weaver did the playoffs. In 1970–71, Roy Storey worked play-by-play on KEEN radio while Rick Weaver called 10 games on KTVU. In 1972–73, Joe Starkey called the games on KEEN radio while Jon Miller worked 15 games (all on delay) on KFTY 50. Starkey continued to call the Golden Seals games on KEEN in 1974–75 and 1975–76. In the Golden Seals' final season, their games were televised on KBHK-TV 44.

See also

 List of California Golden Seals players
 List of California Golden Seals head coaches
 List of NHL players
 List of NHL seasons
 1967 NHL expansion

Notes

References

Bibliography

External links
Site by author and Society for International Hockey Research member Steve Currier about the franchise

 
Bankruptcy in the United States
Defunct National Hockey League teams
National Hockey League in the San Francisco Bay Area
Ice hockey clubs established in 1967
Ice hockey clubs disestablished in 1976
1967 establishments in California
1976 disestablishments in California